The Jazz at Lincoln Center Orchestra is an American big band and jazz orchestra led by Wynton Marsalis. The Orchestra is part of Jazz at Lincoln Center, a performing arts organization in New York City.

History
In 1988 the Orchestra was formed as an outgrowth of its concert series, Classical Jazz, with David Berger conducting. When Wynton Marsalis became artistic director in 1991, he emphasized the history of jazz, particularly Duke Ellington. The first album was Portraits by Ellington (1992), and seven years later the Ellington centennial was honored with the album Live in Swing City: Swingin' with the Duke (1999).

Under the leadership of Marsalis, the band performs at its home in Lincoln Center, tours throughout the U.S. and abroad, visits schools, appears on television, and performs with symphony orchestras. The Orchestra backed Wynton Marsalis on his album Blood on the Fields, which won the Pulitzer Prize.

Since 2015, the Orchestra's albums have been issued on its own label, Blue Engine Records.

Personnel
 Wynton Marsalis – trumpet
 Ryan Kisor – trumpet
 Marcus Printup – trumpet
 Kenny Rampton – trumpet
 Chris Crenshaw – trombone
 Vincent Gardner – trombone
 Elliot Mason – trombone
 Robert Stewart – saxophone
 Walter Blanding – saxophone
 Victor Goines – saxophone
 Sherman Irby – saxophone
 Ted Nash – saxophone
 Paul Nedzela – baritone saxophone
 Dan Nimmer – piano
 Carlos Henriquez – double bass
 Obed Calvaire – drums

Discography 
 Portraits by Ellington (1992)
 Jazz at Lincoln Center Presents: The Fire of the Fundamentals (1994)
 They Came to Swing (1994)
 Blood on the Fields (Columbia, 1997) 
 Live in Swing City: Swingin' with Duke (1999)
 Big Train (Columbia, 1999) 
 All Rise (Sony Classical, 2002) 
 Lincoln Center Jazz Orchestra with Wynton Marsalis Plays the Music of Duke Ellington (Warner Bros., 2004) 
 Cast of Cats (2004)
 A Love Supreme (2005)
 Don't Be Afraid: The Music of Charles Mingus (2005)
 Congo Square (2007)
 Portrait in Seven Shades (Jazz at Lincoln Center, 2010)
 Vitoria Suite (Universal, 2010) 
 Wynton Marsalis and Eric Clapton Play the Blues (2011)
 Live in Cuba (Blue Engine, 2015)
 Big Band Holidays (Blue Engine, 2015)
 The Abyssinian Mass (Blue Engine, 2016)
 The Music of John Lewis (Blue Engine, 2017)
 All Jazz Is Modern: 30 Years of Jazz at Lincoln Center Vol. 1 (2017)
 Handful of Keys (Blue Engine, 2017)
 United We Swing: Best of the Jazz at Lincoln Center Galas (2018)
 Una Noche con Rubén Blades (2018)
 Swing Symphony (2019)
 Jazz and Art (2019)
 Jazz for Kids (2019)
 Big Band Holidays II (2019)
 Sherman Irby's Inferno (2020)
 The Music of Wayne Shorter (2020)
 Black, Brown, and Beige (2020)
 Rock Chalk Suite (2020)
 Christopher Crenshaw's The Fifties: A Prism (2020)

References 

American jazz ensembles from New York City
Big bands
Lincoln Center
Musical groups established in 1988
Musical groups from New York City
Swing music
Jazz musicians from New York (state)